2-[2-(4-Methyl-3-cyclohexen-1-yl)propyl]cyclopentanone (trade name by Givaudan: Nectaryl) is an organic compound belonging to the group of ketones and cycloalkanes. The compound is used as a fragrance.

Synthesis 
The synthesis of the compound is carried out by a radical addition of cyclopentanone to (+)-limonene under oxygen in acetic acid. As a catalyst, manganese(II) acetate and cobalt(II) acetate are used.

Properties 
The flash point of the compound is 162.5 °C, and the autoignition temperature is 294 °C. The specific rotation is reported to be [α]D20=+228–235° (1 M; chloroform)

In general, the compound features a fruity apricot-like odor. Of the four stereo isomers, (2R,2′S,1′′R)-Nectaryl and (2R,2′R,1′′R)-Nectaryl contribute especially to the compound's odor, the odor detection threshold lies at 0.094 ng·l−1 and 0.112 ng·l−1, respectively. In contrast to that, the other stereo isomers show an unspecific fruity odor, the odor detection threshold are 11.2 ng·l−1 and 14.9 ng·l−1 which is much higher.

The tenacity on blotter (the time during which the compound is smellable with unchanged characteristics) is reported to be three weeks.

Uses 
The substance is used as a fragrance in exemplary air conditioning products, perfumes and polishes.

Literature 

Cyclohexenes
Cyclic ketones
Perfume ingredients